Nickelodeon is a European pay television channel available in Spain and Portugal and operated by Paramount Networks EMEAA. The channel is aimed at children and teenagers.

History

The channel was launched in Spain on 27 March 1999 as a localised variant of American kids channel Nickelodeon. On 1 June 2005, a feed of the Central European Nickelodeon channel was launched in Portugal with Portuguese audio with partial local ad breaks.

On 1 September 2009, the Portuguese channel changed its source feed to Nickelodeon Spain. On 1 April 2010, Nickelodeon rebranded its graphical package with a new logo and new bumpers. On 22 November 2012, it changed its aspect ratio from 4:3 to 16:9.

On 15 January 2015, an HD version of the Spanish feed of the channel was launched exclusively on satellite provider Canal+ (currently Movistar+) (available only in Spain).

On 1 December 2017, Nickelodeon started to be carried by Portuguese TV provider Nowo. On August 2019, Nickelodeon started with the CEE promos, removing end credits and now bumpers. On 31 March 2020, Nickelodeon began to be carried by Portuguese TV provider Meo. Later, on 14 April 2020, Nickelodeon was launched in another Portuguese TV provider, Vodafone Portugal. On the morning of 15 February 2021, Nickelodeon became unavailable on Nowo.

Programming blocks

Former programming blocks

Noches Nick 
Noches Nick was a night time programming block on Nickelodeon Iberia and was a localized variant of the American version of the block Nick@Nite, Not much is currently known about this block.

TeenNick
TeenNick was a Daytime programming block on Nickelodeon Iberia and was a localized variant of the American version of the TeenNick block. It was available in Spain in March 21, 2004 to 2014, and in Portugal in 2008 to 2016. The running time was 11h to 12h in Spain from 2004 to 2008. In 2009, it became a 24hour block. In Portugal, the running time was 5h to 6h, then 10h to 14h. In 2013, it became a 24hour block. It airs Nickelodeon programming in Spain from 11h to 12h, and in Portugal from 5h to 6h, and 10h to 13h. In Saturdays and Sundays, it's instead 10h to 14h.

References

External links 
 

Spain
1999 establishments in Spain
Television channels and stations established in 1999
Television in Andorra
Television stations in Spain
Television stations in Portugal
2005 establishments in Portugal
Spanish-language television stations
Portuguese-language television stations
Television stations in Angola
Television channels in Mozambique
Television stations in Cape Verde
Television stations in Equatorial Guinea